The World University Karate Championships is a competition sponsored by the International University Sports Federation (FISU) and have been held every two years since 1998 each time in a different host city.

University 

 World University Karate Championships

Champions

Men

Women

References 
 2012 World University Karate Championship - 2012-07-13
 2014 World University Karate Championship - 2014-06-19
 2016 World University Karate Championship - 2016-08-10 
 2018 World University Karate Championship - 2018-07-19

World University Championships
Karate competitions